Free Church of Scotland may refer to:
 Free Church of Scotland (1843–1900), seceded in 1843 from the Church of Scotland. The majority merged in 1900 into the United Free Church of Scotland; historical 
 Free Church of Scotland (since 1900), remained outside the 1900 merger; extant
 Free Church of Scotland (Continuing), seceded in 2000 from the post-1900 Free Church; extant